The Salbitbrücke is a high alpine pedestrian bridge in the canton of Uri in Switzerland.

Location 
The Salbitbrücke is on the south flank of the Salbitschijen mountain. To get to the bridge, there is an alpine hiking route that takes 4–5 hours (difficulty level T4). The bridge is accessible from the Voralphütte and the Salbithütte, two nearby mountain huts of the Swiss Alpine Club.

Description 
Ropes and straps can be rented in the Salbithütte and the Voralphütte, which is generally recommended.

The design of the bridge is based on that of the Nepalese bridges in the Himalaya. It was built using parts from the Trift Bridge (Triftbrücke) standing in the canton of Bern.

Climbers were concerned that mass tourism would come into the wild mountain valley via the bridge, but this has not happened.

Gallery

References

External links 

Pedestrian bridges in Switzerland